Caladenia roei is a species of orchid endemic to the south-west of Western Australia. It is also known as the common clown orchid, clown orchid, ant orchid, man orchid and jack-in-the-box. It has a single erect, hairy leaf and up to three greenish-yellow and red flowers with a relatively broad labellum.  It is a common orchid throughout the south-west and is especially common on granite outcrops.

Description
The lateral sepals and petals are about the same size as the dorsal sepal and turn obliquely downward and form a crucifix-like shape. Flowering occurs from August to October.

Taxonomy and naming
Caladenia roei was first described in 1873 by Alex George and the description was published in Flora Australiensis. The specific epithet (roei) honours John Septimus Roe.

Distribution and habitat
The clown orchid is found across a wide area of the south-west of Western Australia from as far north as the Murchison River to as far east as Ravensthorpe where it grows in a range of habitats but is especially common on granite outcrops.

Conservation
Caladenia roei is classified as "not threatened" by the Western Australian Government Department of Parks and Wildlife.

References

roei
Endemic orchids of Australia
Orchids of Western Australia
Plants described in 1873
Endemic flora of Western Australia